The 1st Division is a formation of the Nigerian Army. It was established during the Nigerian civil war and is charged with securing its area of responsibility covering the North Western flank of Nigeria and also ensuring that the borders located in its AOR are secured. The division is a mechanized infantry with affiliated combat support and combat service support units.

History 
In August–September 1967, 1 Area Command at Kaduna was predesignated 1 Infantry Division, and 2 Division was formed under Colonel Murtala Mohammed. At the end of the Civil War, the three divisions of the army were reorganized into four divisions, with each controlling territories running from North to South, with each division having access to the sea. This was later abandoned in favor of the assignment of sectors to the divisions.

Divisional components

 Division Headquarters (Kaduna)
 241st Recce Battalion (Nguru)
 1st Mechanised Brigade (Sokoto)
 65th Mechanised Battalion
 81st Motorised Battalion
 223rd Light Battalion
 3rd Brigade (Kano)
 41st Division Engineers
 a signals formation of brigade size
 31st Artillery Brigade 

The existence of 3rd Brigade at Kano was corroborated by a May 2015 report of 1,000 soldiers dismissed "for allegedly disobeying orders during onslaughts against Boko Haram militants in the North-east."

17 Brigade began its formation in late 2017, and was officially established on 20 February 2018 for internal security duties. It became part of 1 Division.

Commanders
Colonel Mohammed Shuwa (August 1967-September 1969)
Brigadier Illiya Bisalla (September 1969-December 1973)
Brigadier I.B. Haruna (December 1973-July 1975)
Major General Ipoola Alani Akinrinade (August 1975-January 1978)
Brigadier Domkat Bali (January 1978-September 1978)
Brigadier P.A. Eromobor (September 1978-September 1979)
Major General George Agbazika Innih (October 1979-April 1980)
Major General David Jemibewon (January 1980-November 1981)
Major General A.D. Aduloju (January 1981-August 1983)
Major General H.A. Hananiya (August 1983-January 1984)
Brigadier J.O. Oni (January 1984-September 1985)
Major General P.I. Adomokhai (September 1985-October 1988)
Major General M.S. Sami (October 1988-January 1990)
Major General Ike Nwachukwu (January 1990-September 1990)
Major General A.A. Abubakar (September 1990-November 1991)
Brigadier General A.M. Daku (November 1991-January 1993)
Brigadier General John Nanzip Shagaya (January 1993-September 1993)
Brigadier General Chris Alli (September 1993-December 1993)
Brigadier General Alwali Kazir (December 1993-August 1994)
Brigadier General A.A. Abdullahi (September 1994-April 1996)
Brigadier General M.O. Sule (April-July 1996)
Major General M.O. Sule (July 1996-December 1996)
Major General A.S. Mukhtar (December 1996-June 1999)
Major General Alexander Ogomudia (1 July 1999-April 2001)
Major General D.R.A. Ndefo (1 May-August 2002)
Major General S.A.  Asemota (August 2002-January 2005)
Major General O.A. Azazi (January 2005-July 2006)
Major General L.O. Jokotola (July 2006-2007)
Major General M.B. Obi
 Major General K.A. Role (2008-2010)
Major General Shoboiki (2010-2012)
Major General G.A. Wahab (2012-2014)
Major General K.C.  Osuji (2014–2015)
Major General A. Oyebade (2015- 2017)
Major General M. Mohammed (October 2017-2018)
Major General Faruk Yahaya (2018-2021)

External links 
Nigeria Army official website

References

Army units and formations of Nigeria
Military units and formations established in 1967